Thomas S. Bianchi is an oceanographer and biogeochemist. He is currently the Jon and Beverly Thompson Endowed Chair of Geological Sciences at the University of Florida and Editor-in-chief of the journal Marine Chemistry.

Early life and education 

Bianchi was born in 1956 in Richmond Hill, New York, and moved to Holbrook in eastern Long Island where he stayed through his early college years. As a child he was very interested in basketball, largely influenced by his uncle, Al Bianchi, who was a professional basketball player. Bianchi has played drums through much of his life, and became interested in oceanography very early on. He earned his Ph.D. from University of Maryland in 1987.

Research and career 
Bianchi has been a professor at the University of Florida since 2013. Before joining UF he held full professor positions at Tulane University and Texas A&M University.

Awards and recognition 
Fellow of the American Geophysical Union for his exceptional contributions in his respective field of Earth and space sciences, 2019.
Qilu Friendship Award, People's Government of Shandong Province, China, 2018.
 Fellow of the Geochemical Society and the European Association of Geochemistry, 2017.
 Fellow of the Association for the Sciences of Limnology and Oceanography, 2017.
 Fellow of the American Association for the Advancement of Science, 2013.

Personal life 
Bianchi is the son of Rita and Tom Bianchi and is married to Jo Ann Bianchi (artist). They have a son,  Christopher T. Bianchi (video artist).

Books 

Gulf of Mexico: Origin, Waters, and Biota (Vol. 5, Chemical Oceanography) (published in 2019 by Texas A&M University Press)
Deltas and Humans: A Long Relationship Now Threatened by Global Change. Oxford University Press. 2016. .
Biogeochemical Dynamics at Major River-Coastal Interfaces: Linkages with Global Change. Cambridge University Press. 2014. .
Chemical Biomarkers in Aquatic Ecosystems. Princeton University Press. 2011. .
Hypoxia in the Northern Gulf of Mexico. Springer. 2010. .
Biogeochemistry of Estuaries. Oxford University Press. 2006. .
Biogeochemistry of Gulf of Mexico Estuaries. John Wiley & Sons. 1998. .

Selected publications 

Tom Bianchi has published over 300 articles.

 Centers of organic carbon burial at the land-ocean interface.
 Carbon storage in the Mississippi River delta enhanced by environmental engineering.
 High rates of organic carbon burial in fjord sediments globally.
 The changing carbon cycle of the coastal ocean
 The role of terrestrially derived organic carbon in the coastal ocean: A changing paradigm and the priming effect.
 The science of hypoxia in the Northern Gulf of Mexico: A review.
 Large-river delta-front estuaries as natural “recorders” of global environmental change.
 Temporal variability in sources of dissolved organic carbon in the lower Mississippi River.
 Cyanobacterial blooms in the Baltic Sea: Natural or human-induced?
 Natural photolysis by ultraviolet irradiance of recalcitrant dissolved organic matter to simple substrates for rapid bacterial metabolism.

References

External links 
 

1956 births
Living people
University of Florida faculty
American oceanographers
Fellows of the American Geophysical Union
Fellows of the American Association for the Advancement of Science